Mbwana Yusuf Kilungi (born 3 October 1991), better known by his stage name Mbosso Khan is a Tanzanian singer and songwriter born in Kibiti, Pwani Region, he is currently based in Dar es Salaam and signed under WCB Wasafi record label. Mbosso is known for his songs "Nadekezwa" and "Hodari" which won Video of the Year at HiPipo Awards 2019. Mbosso released his debut studio album, Definition of Love, in March 2021.

Early life
Mbosso was born and raised in Kibiti, a small town in Tanzania on 3 October 1991. His mother is Hadija Salom Kikaali, and his father is Yusufu Mbwana Kilungi.

Career 
He started his music career as one of four members of Yamoto Band between 2013 and 2015. At that time his stage name was "Maromboso". The group was named best band of 2015 at Kilimanjaro Music Awards. The musical group later disbanded in 2015.

In 2018 Mbosso was signed to WCB Wasafi, a record label founded by Diamond Platnumz where he re-launched his music career as a solo artist and released songs including "Maajabu", "Picha Yake", "Tamu" and "Tamba"

In 2020, Mbosso hit 1 million subscribers on YouTube and became one of the four Tanzanian Musicians with over a million subscribers. He was awarded the YouTube Golden Plaque.

In 2021, Mbosso released his debut studio album titled "Definition of Love". The album was released on 9 March and it featured artists such as Diamond Platnumz, Njenje Band, Mr Flavour, Rayvanny, Liya, Darassa, Spice Diana and Baba Levo.

Discography 
Albums

 Definition Of Love

Singles

References 

Living people
1995 births
21st-century Tanzanian male singers
People from Pwani Region